Agama lionotus is a species of lizard from the family Agamidae, found in Tanzania, Uganda, Kenya and Ethiopia. It is commonly referred to as the Kenyan rock agama, and is often confused with the red-headed rock agama.

Subspecies
Its subspecies are:

 A. l. elgonis Lönnberg, 1922
 A. l. lionotus Boulenger, 1896
 A. l. ufipae Loveridge, 1923

References

lionotus
Reptiles described in 1896
Taxa named by George Albert Boulenger